Delbert Fitzpatrick (born 12 November 1919, date of death unknown) was a Trinidadian cricketer. He played in two first-class matches for Trinidad and Tobago in 1943/44 and 1951/52.

See also
 List of Trinidadian representative cricketers

References

External links
 

1919 births
Year of death missing
Trinidad and Tobago cricketers